Ronald Leslie Moore  (8 March 1933 – 18 August 2018) was a New Zealand international speedway rider. He twice won the Individual World Speedway Championship, in 1954 and 1959.

Early life
Moore was born in Hobart, Tasmania in 1933. He moved with his family to New Zealand when he was still a child, and although he was born in Australia, Moore always considered himself to be a New Zealander and rode under the flag of his adopted home.

Career
Moore began riding at the Aranui Speedway in Christchurch, New Zealand, in 1949 at the age of 15. He moved to England and rode for the Wimbledon Dons from 1950 to 1956. Moore represented Australia in Test Match series in England in 1951, 1952 and 1953, although subsequently he raced for New Zealand, and Australasia (combined Australia and New Zealand), as well as representing Great Britain in the World Team Cup. In 1957 and 1958 he switched his attention to motor racing, but returned to ride for the Dons in late 1958 and stayed with them until 1963 when he decided to retire from racing after breaking his leg in a track crash. He began riding again in New Zealand in the mid-1960s and made a comeback with Wimbledon in 1969 and reached the World Final at the age of 36. In 1970 he won the World Pairs Championship with Ivan Mauger. He retired from racing in the British League at the end of 1972, apart from a couple of meetings for Coventry Bees in August 1974, but continued riding speedway until 1975 when he suffered severe head injuries in a crash at Jerilderie Park Speedway in New South Wales.

Moore won the New Zealand Championship in 1956, 1962, 1968 and 1969.

World Individual Championship
In 1950 at the age of 17, Moore was the youngest rider ever to qualify for the final of the Speedway World Championship. He won the championship in 1954 and again in 1959. He also finished runner up on three further occasions. His first win came when he was only 21 years of age, riding with a broken leg, and he won with a maximum score.

World final appearances

Individual World Championship
 1950 –  London, Wembley Stadium – 10th – 7pts
 1951 –  London, Wembley Stadium – 4th – 11pts
 1952 –  London, Wembley Stadium – 4th – 10pts
 1953 –  London, Wembley Stadium – 6th – 9pts
 1954 –  London, Wembley Stadium – Winner – 15pts
 1955 –  London, Wembley Stadium – 2nd – 12pts + 3pts
 1956 –  London, Wembley Stadium – 2nd – 12pts
 1958 –  London, Wembley Stadium – 6th – 9pts
 1959 –  London, Wembley Stadium – Winner – 15pts
 1960 –  London, Wembley Stadium – 2nd – 14pts + 2pts
 1961 –  Malmö, Malmö Stadion – 6th – 10pts
 1962 –  London, Wembley Stadium – 5th – 9pts
 1969 –  London, Wembley Stadium – 11th – 6pts
 1970 –  Wroclaw, Olympic Stadium – Reserve – Did Not Ride
 1971 –  Gothenburg, Ullevi – 10th – 5pts

World Pairs Championship
 1970 –  Malmö, Malmö Stadion (with Ivan Mauger) – Winner – 28pts (16)
 1972 –  Borås (with Ivan Mauger) – 2nd – 24pts (10)

World Team Cup
 1962 –  Slaný (with Barry Briggs / Peter Craven / Ron How / Cyril Maidment) – 2nd – 24pts (10)
Note: Moore rode for Great Britain in the World Team Cup from 1962

After speedway
Moore was appointed a Member of the Order of the British Empire in the 1985 Queen's Birthday Honours, for services to speedway sport. The Canterbury Park Motorcycle Speedway was renamed the Moore Park Motorcycle Speedway in his honour and the Ronnie Moore race school operates out of the speedway.

Moore died on 18 August 2018 in Christchurch from lung cancer, aged 85.

References

External links
 

1933 births
2018 deaths
New Zealand speedway riders
New Zealand motorcycle racers
Individual Speedway World Champions
Speedway World Pairs Champions
New Zealand Members of the Order of the British Empire
Wimbledon Dons riders
Coventry Bees riders
Australian emigrants to New Zealand
Sportspeople from Hobart